The Michigan Civil Service Commission is a four-member constitutional created commission to administer Michigan's classified state civil service and human resource functions.

History
Initially created in Michigan's 1908 Constitution, the commission continued into the next ratified Constitution of 1963.  In the Executive Organization Act of 1965, the Department of Civil Service with the commission as its head with its chief administrative officer being the State Personnel Director.  Under EXECUTIVE ORDER No.2007 - 30, the Department of Civil Service was abolished with the Board of Ethics, State Officers Compensation Commission and Civil Service Commission transfer to Department of Management and Budget.

References

Civil Service Commission